"Man's best friend" is a common phrase used to describe domestic dogs, referring to their millennia-long history of close relations, loyalty, friendship, and companionship with humans. The first recorded use of a related phrase is by Frederick the Great of Prussia. It was likely popularized by its use in a poem by Ogden Nash and has since become a common colloquialism.

Before the 19th century, breeds of dogs (other than lap dogs) were largely functional. They performed activities such as hunting, tracking, watching, protecting and guarding; and language describing the dog often reflected these roles. According to the Oxford English Dictionary, "In the oldest proverbs and phrases dogs are rarely depicted as faithful or as man’s best friend, but as vicious, ravening, or watchful." Beginning in the 18th century, multiplying in the 19th and flourishing in the 20th century, language and attitudes towards dogs began to shift. Possibly, this societal shift can be attributed to discovery of the rabies vaccine in 1869.

Argos and Odysseus

In Homer's Odyssey (c. 8th century BC), upon Odysseus' return, his beloved dog Argos is the only individual to recognize him.

In Mahabharata

This passage is from near the end of the Mahabharata, the Pandavas, having given up all their belongings and ties, made their final journey of pilgrimage to the Himalayas accompanied by a dog. Yudhishthira was the only one to reach the mountain peak in his mortal body, because he was unblemished by sin or untruth. On reaching the top, Indra asked him to abandon the dog before entering the Heaven. But Yudhishthira refused to do so, citing the dog's unflinching loyalty as a reason. It turned out that the dog was his god-father, Dharma. The story symbolized that dharma follows you until the end.

Sources

King Frederick of Prussia
The statement Dog is man's best friend was first recorded as being made by Frederick, King of Prussia (1740–1786). Frederick referred to one of his Italian Greyhounds as his best friend.

Poet C.S. van Winkle
The earliest citation in the U.S. is traced to a poem by C.S. Winkle printed in The New-York Literary Journal, Volume 4, 1821:
The faithful dog – why should I strive 
To speak his merits, while they live
In every breast, and man's best friend 
Does often at his heels attend.

Attorney George Graham Vest
In 1870 Warrensburg, Missouri, George Graham Vest represented a farmer suing for damages after his dog, Old Drum, had been shot and killed. During the trial, Vest stated that he would "win the case or apologize to every dog in Missouri." 

Vest's closing argument to the jury made no reference to any of the testimony offered during the trial, and instead offered a eulogy of sorts. Vest's "Eulogy of the Dog" is one of the most enduring passages of purple prose in American courtroom history (only a partial transcript has survived):

Vest won the case (the jury awarded $50 to the dog's owner) and also won its appeal to the Missouri Supreme Court.

In 1958, a statue of Old Drum was erected on the Johnson County Courthouse lawn containing a summation of Vest's closing speech, “A man’s best friend is his dog.”

As well, a bust of the dog resides in the Missouri Supreme Court building in Jefferson City, Missouri.

Voltaire
Much earlier, however, Voltaire had written in his Dictionnaire philosophique of 1764:
CHIEN. — Il semble que la nature ait donné le chien à l'homme pour sa défense et pour son plaisir. C'est de tous les animaux le plus fidèle : c'est le meilleur ami que puisse avoir l'homme.

Translated, this reads:
DOG. — It seems that nature has given the dog to man for his defense and for his pleasure. Of all the animals it is the most faithful : it is the best friend man can possibly have.

Ogden Nash
In 1941, Ogden Nash wrote "An Introduction to Dogs," beginning:
The dog is man's best friend.
He has a tail on one end.
Up in front he has teeth.
And four legs underneath.

References

Dogs as pets
English-language idioms
Metaphors referring to dogs
1780s neologisms